The 2010 United States Senate election in Missouri took place on November 2, 2010 alongside 36 other elections to the United States Senate in other states as well as elections to the United States House of Representatives and various state and local elections. Primary elections were held on August 3, 2010. Incumbent Republican U.S. Senator Kit Bond decided to retire instead of seeking a fifth term. Republican nominee Roy Blunt won the open seat.

Republican primary

Candidates 
 Roy Blunt, U.S. Representative since 1997
 Davis Conway
 Tony Laszacs
 Hector Maldonado, sales representative
 Kristi Nichols, sales manager, activist, perennial candidate
 R.L. Praprotnik
 Chuck Purgason, State Senator
 Deborah Solomon
 Mike Vontz

Polling

Results

Democratic primary

Candidates 
 Robin Carnahan, Missouri Secretary of State, daughter of former U.S. Senator Jean Carnahan and former governor Mel Carnahan
 Richard Charles Tolbert
 Francis Vangeli

Results

Other primaries

Constitution

Candidates

Declared 
 Jerry Beck
 Joe Martellaro
 Mike Simmons

Libertarian

Candidates

Declared 
 Jonathan Dine
 Cisse Spragins

General election

Candidates 
 Roy Blunt (R), U.S. Representative
 Robin Carnahan (D), Missouri Secretary of State
 Jerry Beck (C)
 Jonathan Dine (L)
 Mark S. Memoly (write-in)
 Frazier Glenn Miller (write-in), perennial candidate
 Jeff Wirick (write-in)
 Richie L. Wolfe (write-in)

Campaign 
Carnahan and national Democrats have heavily criticized Blunt for his support of bailouts, calling him "Bailout Blunt." Blunt criticized her for supporting President Obama's stimulus package, the cap-and-trade energy bill, and the health care reform bill.

Carnahan was endorsed by the Kansas City Star, the St. Louis Post-Dispatch, and the St. Louis American.

Blunt was endorsed by the Quincy Herald-Whig and the St. Joseph News-Press.

Debates 
 October 14: Televised on Kansas City Public Television in Kansas City, Missouri.
 October 18: Missouri Press Association convention in Lake of the Ozarks State Park.
 October 29: Televised on KTVI in St. Louis.

Predictions

Polling

Fundraising

Results

See also 
 United States Senate elections, 2010
 Missouri state auditor election, 2010
 Missouri Senate elections, 2010

References

External links 
 Elections from the Missouri Secretary of State
 Official candidate lists
 U.S. Congress candidates for Missouri at Project Vote Smart
 Missouri U.S. Senate 2010 from OurCampaigns.com
 Campaign contributions from Open Secrets
 2010 Missouri Senate General Election: Roy Blunt (R) vs Robin Carnahan (D) graph of multiple polls from Pollster.com
 Election 2010: Missouri Senate from Rasmussen Reports
 2010 Missouri Senate - Blunt vs. Carnahan from Real Clear Politics
 2010 Missouri Senate Race from CQ Politics
 Race profile from The New York Times
 News coverage from The Midwest Democracy Project at The Kansas City Star
 News coverage at the St. Louis Post-Dispatch
Official campaign websites
 Roy Blunt for U.S. Senate
 Robin Carnahan for U.S. Senate
 Jerry Beck for U.S. Senate
 Cisse Spragins for U.S. Senate
 Hector Maldonado for U.S. Senate

Missouri
2010
United States Senate